The Renault Morphoz is an electric concept car built by Renault which was presented in March 2020.

Presentation 
The name Morphoz comes from the concept car's ability to modify its morphology, by modifying its length. The Morphoz follows the logic of the names of the concept cars that preceded it (DeZir, TreZor and Symbioz) by including a "Z" in his surname, just like the EZ concept series (EZ-Pro, EZ-Go, EZ-Ultimo, EZ-Flex, EZ-POD).

The Renault Morphoz concept car was to be presented at the 2020 Geneva Motor Show on 3 March 2020. but it was canceled due to the COVID-19 pandemic in Switzerland. On that date, however, it was unveiled in pictures on the Internet.

Renault Morphoz Concept 
MORPHOZ is a concept car that presents Groupe Renault’s vision of personal and shared electric mobility.
MORPHOZ adapts to all uses and heralds a new family of autonomous, futuristic, and ingenious electric models.

Electric in character and personality 
Renault‘s iconic C-Shape lighting, induction charger and HD digital cameras replacing the wing mirrors all represent the sustainable, electric power of MORPHOZ.
Beneath its crossover look, MORPHOZ combines style with its bold yet smooth lines. Featuring a retractable dashboard, pivoting passenger seat and rear sliding seats, the interior cabin is fully adaptable.

City Mode 
MORPHOZ ’s strong look is highlighted by its own custom lighting signature, giving it a distinctive style. Featuring a short bonnet and a tucked rear bumper, it minimizes overhang so that driving and parking in the city is easier.
In addition to its 400-km driving range, MORPHOZ is flexible and adaptable enough to easily handle whatever you need in the city. MORPHOZ City Mode becomes the symbol for electric city car agility.

Travel Mode
Fitted with the Travel Extender, MORPHOZ allows you to carry 50 kWh in additional batteries, so you can cover long distances with a 700-km driving range. With a streamlined profile and prow and custom front end, its aerodynamics have been optimised. 
In its long version, MORPHOZ offers more legroom for passengers and space for additional luggage. On board, everything is centered on the occupants and their interactions.

A true car for living
On board MORPHOZ, passengers enjoy a spacious and accommodating cabin. Conviviality reigns in a space that encourages occupants to share and interact. The atmosphere is friendly and serene. Artificial intelligence greets the driver, serving as a proactive virtual assistant that is attentive to any request.
When “Sharing” mode is activated, the passenger seat pivots to face the rear so that all passengers can be together as if they were in their living room. Artificial intelligence offers playlists or video game challenges to encourage interaction between passengers.

For a sustainable, shared mobility
MORPHOZ concept car embodies Groupe Renault’s commitment to supporting the mobility revolution. It makes sharing a fundamental concept, while meeting the challenges of the city of tomorrow. 
With the “Travel Extender” multi-purpose batteries, MORPHOZ is perfectly suited to this environment. When not used in the car, they can power equipment at home or even in the neighbourhood. They can also be made available at a charging point for other vehicles to use. Perfectly in line with the Smart City ecosystem, MORPHOZ drives safely, in harmony with other users, drivers and pedestrians.

References

External links 

Morphoz
Electric concept cars